Đuro Vilović (11 December 1889 22 December 1958) was a Yugoslav publicist, one of the most widely read and controversial writers of Croatian interwar literature and a member of the Chetniks.

Initially, a Croatian nationalist and a Roman Catholic priest, Vilović left the Roman Catholic church, joining a Serbian nationalist Chetnik movement during World War II and becoming a close ally of Draža Mihailović, for which he was sentenced to 7 years in prison at the Belgrade Process in 1946 by the new communist regime. He died on 22 December 1958 in Bjelovar.

Biography 
Vilović completed gymnasium high school in Split and theology program in Zadar. Between 1913 and 1915 he was a Roman Catholic priest after which he went to study philosophy in Vienna. He was prosecuted for World War II collaboration after the end of the war.

Literature works 
Vilović was a significant author of Croatian literature. During the Interwar period, he was one of the most popular writers in Yugoslavia.

Novels 

 Aesthete (1919)
 Međumurje (1923)
 Three Hours (1925)
 The Master of the Soul (1931)
 The Bell Mourned the Virgin (1938)

Short stories 

 A Stale Life (1923)
 Mandorlato (1924)
 Croatian North and South (1930).

References 

1889 births
1958 deaths
People from Makarska
Yugoslav Roman Catholics
Croatian writers
Yugoslav prisoners and detainees
Chetnik personnel of World War II
Croatian nationalists
Serbian nationalists